Diploderma laeviventre, also known as the smooth-venter mountain dragon, is a species of lizard. It is endemic to Tibet, China.

References 

Diploderma
Reptiles of China
Endemic fauna of Tibet
Reptiles described in 2016
Taxa named by Cameron D. Siler
Taxa named by Che Jing